Ezra A. Bowen was a Democratic member of the Wisconsin Senate from 1854 to 1855. He was a native of Mayville, Wisconsin.

References

People from Mayville, Wisconsin
Democratic Party Wisconsin state senators
Year of birth missing
Year of death missing